Ancita longicornis is a species of beetle in the family Cerambycidae. It was described by McKeown in 1948. It is known from Australia.

References

Ancita
Beetles described in 1948